Mothman is a 2010 Syfy television film starring Jewel Staite and Connor Fox. The film premiered on Syfy April 24, 2010 and was released on DVD on October 25, 2011.  The film features the song "Fuel" by Surfact in the end credits and on the DVD menu. The film received negative reviews.

Plot 

In Point Pleasant, West Virginia, home to the legend of the Mothman, a group of high school seniors camp out next to a river near an old mill where the Mothman is supposedly buried under the incinerators. While scaring their friend Jamie with the Mothman's legend, the teenagers accidentally drown Jamie. The teenagers decide to cover up the accident by claiming that Jamie hit his head while jumping into the river and fake evidence by hitting his head post-mortem with a rock.

Ten years later, one of the teenagers named Katherine Grant, now a reporter for the Washington Weekly, returns to Point Pleasant after her boss sends her to the tenth Mothman Festival.  Katherine meets with her former boyfriend Derek Carpenter and later with the rest of her friends who accidentally killed Jamie. After Katherine and her friends meet in a bar, Jared heads back to his RV where he is murdered by the Mothman. The next day, Katherine and Derek head to Jared's RV but can't find him. They missed his remains on the other side of the RV. Katherine and Derek head to the Mothman Festival, where they meet a blind old man named Frank Waverly who tells them of the Mothman's legend; warning them that he will strike again. Later that night at the bar, Richard, almost commits suicide over Jamie's death, but changes his mind just as he is about to shoot himself. The Mothman enters through a mirror and kills Richard. The Mothman then brutally murders Sally in her car.

The next day, Katherine, who is now starting to believe in the Mothman, comes to Frank for help.  Frank tells Katherine of how Point Pleasant is the only land in North America never occupied by Indians. This is because they feared that the land was home to an evil spirit.  When the white settlers took over the land, they killed the Indians and their chief Cornstalk escaped to where Point Pleasant is now. The whites found Cornstalk who offered a treaty with the whites. However, the whites tortured him and before dying, Cornstalk summoned the evil spirit to take revenge on any murderers in the area. The whites cut Cornstalk in pieces and put them in a mirror-lined coffin. Hence, the spirit Mothman can only enter the world through reflective surfaces. Katherine leaves and heads back to her motel room where she is attacked by the Mothman who enters through the television screen. Derek arrives and wards off the Mothman.  Katherine and Derek go to Frank for help where Frank admits to blinding himself because he and 2 of his friends accidentally murdered the mayor's son while driving drunk.

Casey later discovers Jared's dead remains at his RV and is attacked by the Mothman. He manages to escape and calls Derek. Frank gives Katherine and her friends a bone-like object to perform a banishing ritual to stop the Mothman. Katherine, Derek, and Casey head to the old mill where they perform the banishing ritual near an incinerator. However, the banishing ritual actually appears to summon the Mothman, which hunts down Katherine and Derek as he chases them through the mill. Just as the Mothman has Katherine and Derek cornered, Casey shoots him and the creature flies off. As Katherine and Derek attempt to escape, Casey shoots at the Mothman again and is carried away by the creature as Katherine and Derek leave.

Katherine and Derek arrive at Frank's where he traps them in a tunnel cornered by the Mothman; Frank explains that it was his little brother who died in the car accident and, to protect the other boys involved in the car accident, he alone was punished by the town.  Katherine and Derek eventually escape and find Casey, who is alive. The three head to the Mothman Festival that night where Frank is planning on the Mothman taking revenge on the entire town. Frank arrives at the festival where all of the attendants spot the Mothman in the sky as he attacks a woman on a Ferris wheel. Katherine and Derek arrive at the scene where Frank is killed by the Mothman, as well as the mayor who shoots at the Mothman. Casey rams the Mothman with his car and attempts to kill the creature. However, the Mothman kills Casey and prepares to kill Katherine. Katherine fires her gun at the Mothman, which sets off an explosion that seems to kill the Mothman. However, the Mothman is still alive and again prepares to kill Katherine. Derek distracts the Mothman until the creature carries him off and drops him. The Mothman then prepares to finally kill Katherine. Katherine stabs the Mothman with the bone-like object which causes the Mothman to burst into flames and black moths.

The next day, Katherine visits Derek, who is wounded and in a hospital. Katherine's eyes turn red and black moths fly from her. She is seemingly possessed by the Mothman and is preparing to kill Derek. As the scene closes, a black moth is seen which bursts into flames and turns into the Mothman's glowing red eyes.

Cast

Reception
The film has received generally negative reviews. Horrorreviews.net said: "It pretty much fails miserably on all accounts but dammit…I was entertained by this f*cker! That’s the only reason I’m giving it a two out of five shroud rating. It deserves a zero, of that there is no doubt. But I’m a sucker for craptacular stuff like this."

Shiversofhorror.com gave the film 2 stars out of 5 and said: "Given that this seems to be a SyFy original movie its not as bad as some of the other shit I’ve seen by them. But had I known it was theirs I honestly wouldn’t have bothered renting it. Their movies are a joke. But, if you like their stuff, have at it. I’ve seen a LOT worse in general, thus the reason this gets 2 stars instead of 1."

References

External links 
 
 
 

Syfy original films
2010 horror films
2010 television films
2010 films
Films set in West Virginia
Mothman in film
American horror television films
2010s monster movies
American monster movies
Films directed by Sheldon Wilson
2010s American films